The 1879 Kentucky Derby was the 5th running of the Kentucky Derby. The race took place on May 20, 1879. The winning horse Lord Murphy set a new Derby record with a winning time of 2:37.00.

Full results

Payout
The winner received a purse of $3,550.
Second place received $200.

References

1879
Kentucky Derby
May 1879 sports events
Derby